Kosa may refer to:

Places
 Kosa, Azerbaijan
 Kosa, Croatia, a village in Croatia
 Kōsa, Kumamoto, a town in Japan
 Kosa, Russia, several places with the name in Russia
 , a village in Bolhrad Raion, Ukraine

People
 Kosa (surname)
 Kōsa (1543–1592), Japanese religious leader
 Kosa (Maoist), Indian guerrilla communist
 Kosa Lek (1632–1683), Siamese trader, military general and minister
 Kosa Pan (1633–1699), Siamese diplomat and minister

Other uses
 Kosa (folklore)
 Kosa (river), a river in Perm Krai, Russia
 Kosa (sports manufacturer), Swedish sports equipment manufacturer
 KOSA-TV, a television station
 Kosa language, a variety of Lunda
 Kosa phenomenon, a sandstorm
 Kosa, a vila in Serbian-Slavic mythology
 Kosha or Kosa, a sheath or layer of the atman or soul according to Vedantic philosophy

See also
 
 Cosa
 Khosa (disambiguation)
 Kossa (disambiguation)
 Koza (disambiguation)
 Xhosa (disambiguation),